Kim Ho-Chul (born November 13, 1955) is a former volleyball player and head coach from South Korea.  Kim was nicknamed magico, for his fantastic playing as a setter when he was a player in Italy. He contributed to South Korea men's national volleyball team as a setter from 1975 to 1988, and also won a gold medal in the Asian Games as a head coach in 2006. He competed at the 1984 Summer Olympics and the 1988 Summer Olympics.

He joined the Skywalkers as coach in November 2003 and led his team the champion of South Korean Volleyball Championship twice.

Clubs

Honours
1978 Asian Games Bangkok — Gold medal
1979 Summer Universiad Mexico — Gold medal
1986 Winter League of South Korea — MVP
1981, 1983, 1984 Italian Volleyball League — Best Player Awards
2005-2006 V-League — Best Head-coach Award
2006 Asian Games Doha — Gold medal
2006-2007 V-League — Best Head-coach Award

References

1955 births
Living people
People from Miryang
South Korean men's volleyball players
South Korean expatriates in Italy
Expatriate volleyball players in Italy
Asian Games medalists in volleyball
Volleyball players at the 1978 Asian Games
Volleyball players at the 1986 Asian Games
Volleyball players at the 1984 Summer Olympics
Volleyball players at the 1988 Summer Olympics
Olympic volleyball players of South Korea
Asian Games gold medalists for South Korea
Asian Games silver medalists for South Korea
Medalists at the 1978 Asian Games
Medalists at the 1986 Asian Games
South Korean volleyball coaches
Universiade medalists in volleyball
Universiade gold medalists for South Korea
Universiade bronze medalists for South Korea
Sportspeople from South Gyeongsang Province
20th-century South Korean people